Supah Ninjas is an American action superhero teen sitcom, created by Leo Chu and Eric Garcia. The series aired on Nickelodeon from January 17, 2011, to April 27, 2013. It ran for 2 seasons. The first season was filmed in Los Angeles and the second season was filmed at 31st Street Studios in Pittsburgh. 
On March 15, 2012, it was announced that the series was renewed for a second season that premiered on February 9, 2013.

On May 7, 2013, Nickelodeon cancelled the series after two seasons.

Plot
The series revolves around Mike Fukanaga and his friends, Owen and Amanda. After the death of his grandfather, Mike is given a mysterious letter which leads him to discover that he comes from a long line of vigilante ninjas. With Owen, and later Amanda, they are ushered into the world of crime-fighting, forming the team "Supah Ninjas." They are trained with a hologram of Mike's grandfather, whom Owen refers to as "Hologramps" in Empire City.

Cast

Main 

Ryan Potter as Michael "Mike" Fukanaga. He is Japanese-American. Mike is quiet, shy, socially-awkward and a little nerdy (in the pilot, it is said that he is part of a Star Wars fan club). He and his best friend Owen discover a secret underground dojo under his bed, where a hologram of his late grandfather awaits to train him in the ways of the ninja. Mike discovers he is the latest in a long family line of ninjas (besides his slightly inept father), and ultimately learns about leadership, friendship, discipline, deception, and romance while saving Empire City from villains. As said by Hologramps, his reflexes make him incredibly versatile and adaptive. His weapon of choice is a pair of nunchucks and his necklace (or Mon in Japanese) is a disguised shuriken. Mike's friend/co-ninja Amanda is his love interest. In the finale, "The Floating Sword", Mike uses the force palm ability, similar to Kagema Fukanaga's. In the end, the ninjas get the floating sword back with the help of Mike's cousin, Connor. The episode (and the series) ends with Kagema stunning and kidnapping Mike at his school and then escaping through a window.
Carlos Knight as Owen Reynolds. Mike's best friend and fellow-Supah Ninja. He is of African American descent. Owen is a bit eccentric, he has a tendency to overreact, tends to show little discipline, he has smart mouth, but his instincts make him a powerful and fearless warrior nonetheless. Owen loves food and often eats or thinks about eating while the team has big problems to deal with. Owen is known to be lazy at times. He is the only character to call Grandpa Fukunaga "Hologramps". As said by Hologramps, his instincts make him fearless. His signature weapon is a Bō staff. He's always trying to impress girls, especially Kelly and later Paloma Peru, sometimes using Amanda or Mike as a "wing-man" of sorts.
Gracie Dzienny as Amanda McKay. She is a smart, stylish, socially apt, pretty, talented, and popular cheerleader, ninja, and scholar which, as proclaimed by Mike in the first episode makes her "like a self contained high school" but better looking. In episode one she is kidnapped by The Rhymer and though the ninjas (Mike and Owen) are still in basic training they perform an equally daring and erratic rescue based on her using hand signals Mike translated her using to signal where she had been taken. When she discovers who her rescuers are (because they make it easy by calling each other by name and Amanda recognizes Mike's Mon), she pressures them into letting her in on the action by threatening to tell everyone about the "Supah Ninjas" (coined by Owen) ultimately leading to her inclusion in the group. Her family is wealthy as they own the chain of McKay Casinos (this is why she is kidnapped). Later in the series she seems to develop romantic feelings for Mike that become glaringly obvious in the last handful of episodes. As said by Hologramps, she is distinctive from the rest of the group due to her methodical nature. Her choice weapons are a pair of tonfa.
Travis Wong and Jake Huang alternate as actors within the Yamato suit and Matthew Yang King (as Matt Yang King) voices Yamato, the X-39-P Fighting Robot trainer. The Ninjas sometimes call him Yama as a nickname. He helps the ninjas become better as a practice opponent at the dojo. Yamato usually defeats the ninjas in their sparring matches. He is sarcastic and wise-cracking almost all of the time. He was severely damaged by the fighting robot Kagema Fukanaga created, Hakaisha (meaning the one who destroys or destroyer) in "The Ishina Strike Back". He was later repaired by Kid Q in "Enter the Dojo" and tells the ninjas that the floating sword was never in the dojo. Yamato and Quentin have begun to have a close friendship.
George Takei as Hattori "Hologramps" Fukanaga. The sensei of the Supah Ninjas and Mike's deceased grandfather. A hologram carrying the family ninja legacy, he guides and the Supah Ninjas in an underground high-tech dojo under The Fukanaga home and uses Yamato (mentioned above) to guide them in combat as well as using other tactics (like meditation) to round out their skill sets. At the end of "Subsiders" he is seen watching the ninjas play in Mike's room and talking to Yamato where it becomes apparent he is hiding something huge from the ninjas. It is unknown whether the secret he's hiding is about the Ishina or the Floating Sword. Grandpa was later disabled by his twin brother Kagema Fukanaga in "The Ishina Strike Back". Grandfather is finally brought back by Quentin/Kid Q in "The Floating Sword" and tells the Supah Ninjas it is time to start the next phase of their training with the sword.

Recurring 
Randall Park as Martin Fukanaga, Mike's widowed father (his mother died of some unknown cause) and police officer. Unlike Hologramps and Mike, the "ninja trait" skipped his generation. In the episode "Katara", Martin dates Katara, a knife-wielding cat burglar pursued by the Supah Ninjas. He is very gullible and somewhat clueless but always has the best of intentions at heart for his son. He appeared in all episodes except "Kickbutt", "The Magnificent", "Detention" (mentioned), "The Con Man", "Flint Forster", "Shadow Fly", "Kid Q", "Cheer Fever", and "Finding Forster". He sees the ninjas as heroes when others in law enforcement do not seem to.
Jordan Nichols as Cameron Vanhauser, the son of the owner of Empire Condominiums. He's been in the episodes "Komodo", "The Magnificent", "Morningstar Academy", "Detention" and was mentioned in "Dollhouse". Amanda broke up with him after he told her he felt she was too boring and straight-laced. In "Detention" he had let himself go (not exercising, not bathing, etc.). In the end of the episode, Amanda tells him that he will meet the perfect girl, but she's not the one.
Giselle Bonilla as Kelly, Amanda's friend and fellow cheerleader. Despite her blatant dislike of Owen and Mike she remains the object of Owen's unwarranted flirting and advances. However, it is revealed in "Detention" that she has a soft and considerate side. Kelly has not appeared in the second season leaving her whereabouts unknown.
Victory Van Tuyl as Julie, a kind, smart, and attractive girl who shares a lot in common with Mike, such as a love of comic books. She became Mike's love interest and girlfriend. She has a definite affection for Mike, as revealed in "Frostbite" where she kisses him on the lips after their first real date. In "Flint Forster", she breaks up with Mike through a text because she had moved away 2 weeks prior. She appears in "Dollhouse", "X", "Quake", "Frostbite" and "Cousin Connor".
Marissa Cuevas as Paloma Peru, a school reporter who is introduced in "Shadow Fly". Owen seems to have a crush on her. She is actively pursuing the ninjas.
Matthew Gumley as Quentin, a science nerd, and Owen's friend. Owen's christens him "Kid Q". In "Enter the Dojo" he is given the knowledge of the ninjas secret identity and swears to secrecy. He is the one to help fix the dojo, repair Yamato and help re-enable Hologramps at the dojo.

Main villains
Any villain who made a second appearance, escaped/were not arrested, or vowed revenge include:

Ishina: A rival ninja clan who were against the Fukunaga clan and are after a weapon known as the Floating Sword. They "kidnapped" Connor but it was later revealed to be a set-up, revealing Connor as their leader, serving a more powerful master: Grandpa Fukanaga's evil twin brother Kagema. He finds out Mike, Owen, and Amanda are ninjas in "Quake". They appear again in "Cousin Connnor" where Connor tries to get the ninjas to turn on themselves but Mike finds out that Connor is one of the Ishina and that they all have been tricked by him. This eventually leads to a battle between him and Connor but Kagema takes all the ninjas out and he and Connor escape. Connor manages to get hold of Mike's medallion and uses it to get into the dojo where he intends to relieve Mike of the Floating Sword.
Brandon Soo Hoo as Mike's cousin Connor, the grandson of Mike's grandfather's sister (great-aunt). He's seen in the episodes "Mr. Bradford", "Jellyface", "DJ Elephant Head", "Ishina", "Quake", "Cousin Connor" and "The Con Man". He loves to work with technology (filming Conn'd) and gaming (looking at a game controller at the beginning of "Cousin Connor"). He is also the scheming co-leader of the Ishina (the rival clan of the Fukanaga's). Their goal is to steal the "Floating Sword" back from the Fukanaga family to create a powerful weapon to attempt world domination (or at least enacting revenge on the members of the Fukanaga family). At the end of the first season, and then end of the episode "Cousin Connor," he stole Mike's mon, which he used to open the secret entrance to the dojo. After his infiltration attempt is thwarted, he tricks the ninjas into thinking that the Ishina were holding his parents hostage to try and take out the trio but is foiled again. After the fight he was sent to Madagascar in a shipping crate.
Kagema Fukanaga: Hologramps' evil twin brother and Mike's great uncle. He was entrusted to protect the Floating Sword but betrayed his family attempting to steal it but was thwarted by his brother. He currently is the leader of the Ishina clan. He manages to take out the ninjas and escapes with Connor. In "Grounded Ninja" it's been revealed why he needs the floating sword, to complete his ultimate weapon, a robotic ninja named "Hakaisha - The One Who Destroys". In the episode "The Floating Sword", he was defeated by Mike and Connor, but at the end of the episode Kagema takes Mike at his school and escapes through the window. He is portrayed by George Takei.
The Rhymer: A villain who rhymes when speaking, he was pursued by the Supah Ninjas in the pilot episode. All the places he robbed rhymed with each other. His minions were defeated by Mike and Owen and were arrested, but the Rhymer himself managed to escape, storming off in a fit of rage after saying, "Nothing rhymes with 'oranges!'" He is portrayed by Christopher Reid.
Katara:  Katherine Sharp was a knife-throwing cat burglar who stole priceless antiquities. She started dating Mike's father in order to break into a museum he was guarding. She managed to escape before the ninjas could capture her. She is portrayed by Sydney Tamiia Poitier. She shares her name with Katara from Avatar: The Last Airbender.
Two-Ton Harley: Harland Mauzer is an overweight biker who ate a lot of food to gain weight and reunite with his old gang, the Wrecking Crew. He was taken out by the Ninjas and was recaptured at the end of the episode. He was the first villain that was actually captured by the ninjas. He returns in "Enter the Dojo" when Quentin releases him from prison thinking the ninjas want to face off against their biggest enemy. He breaks into the Food Rodeo and tells the ninjas that when he's finished with his food he'll reunite his crew and break down the city. He was defeated by the ninjas yet again, with the aid of Mike's dad, Martin. He is portrayed by WWE wrestler The Big Show.
Checkmate: An "undefeated" chess prodigy, Nicholias Spaski who cheats and uses elaborate traps to gain the advantage and win. He returns in "Eternum" where he was being held captive, where he quoted, "My queen has returned," hinting that he is Amanda's archenemy. He revealed he told Eternum about her, Mike, and Owen. He tells her how to shut the power which will release all the inmates, including him, but will also save Mike. This leads to Checkmate's escape, leaving "Game On, Ninjas!" written on his cell window, hinting a return. He is portrayed by Rick D. Wasserman.
Red-Eye: A former biology teacher at Benjamin Rush High School, Benjamin Arneson/Bradford became a bug-like monster (whom Owen calls "Red-Eye") when he experimented on himself to try to find a universal cure for disease. He used his newly acquired abilities to break into his old workplace to get the necessary items to create a cure. He managed to find the formula, but he used it to cure Amanda's own infection. He still at large and is still trying to find a way to cure himself, as seen at the end of the episode. He is portrayed by Scott Lowell and seems to be based on Dr. Curtis Connors/the Lizard from the Spider-Man franchise.
Jellyface: Frankie Fellows used Plasma 17 to disguise himself as the people who got him arrested and have them suffer as much as he did. He was taken down by Mike. He returns in "Detention" where he kidnapped Mike at the beginning, posed as him, and smashed the trophy case so he can get into the school on Saturday, where Martin was going to be during Homecoming, and plant a bomb and a tank of poison gas in order to get revenge on both Mike and Martin. His plan was foiled when Owen took him out during a battle with Mike and Amanda defusing the bomb. He apparently knows the ninjas identities.
Malleni the Magnificent: A skilled magician who faked his own kidnapping to frame both his assistant Veronica, and his rival, Dominic the Magnificent. He was stopped when he was kicked into a magic box by Owen. When it split into 3 pieces, so did he, vowing vengeance on the Supah Ninjas. He is portrayed by Vince Corazza.
Quake: Charles White, a forger of music boxes, Charles White wore a special pair of metal gloves that allowed him to work with the hot metal. After his employer died, Charles sought out to collect the music boxes that he had made. However, every time he got his hands on one, he accidentally crushed it and broke out into a rage. Amanda helped him take off his gloves and gave him a music box. He then leaves peacefully. He is portrayed by Esteban Cueto.
Skeleton Crew: A secret society who ties with Benjamin Rush High School. They leave hidden messages by leaving behind a key and a strip of paper which is decoded by being wrapped around the key, they were after a hard drive for an unknown reason and are defeated by the ninjas and arrested. However, a return is hinted when Amanda and Mike find a message wanting revenge from their leader, the Skeleton King.
Flint Forster: A villain that steals from the rich and gives to charity, like a modern-day Robin Hood. Flint has a whole group that helps him. He seems to have an interest in Amanda. He leaves Amanda his necklace before escaping. He returns in "Finding Forster" where he finds out Amanda's identity in a debate at Benjamin Rush High. They are taken hostage by Flint's debate team when he stole a suitcase filled with credit cards. Mike and Owen show up and defeat the debate team and Flint says goodbye to Amanda before leaving. He returns again in "Spring Fling" where he finds Amanda and asks her to the Spring Fling dance, soon he discovers that Chop Shop is here to get revenge on him, soon Amanda finds out that Flint stole from him, Flint escapes but Amanda is captured, soon he finds out that Mike and Owen are the other ninjas and they return to the garage and defeat Chop Shop and his crew, Flint decides to call the police himself. Flint Forster is a reference to Robin Hood and dresses similar to Hawkeye (Clint Barton). He is portrayed by Cody Christian and is the second villain to have a close relationship with a main character.

Minor villains
Any villain that was arrested, defeated, or made one appearance/does not make a return:
 Subsiders: A crew that lived in the shadows of abandoned subway tunnels. Every time a new member joins they give them a new name. The crew included Subsider (Christopher Kien Dao), Moth (Xin Sarith Wuku), Toad (Victor Lopez), Roach (Gabriel Nunez), Rat (Caine Sinclair), and Viper (Ramses Jimenez). They wear hoodies and white masks and they rob trucks full of valuable items such as money. Owen's friend James (Jonny Weston) used to be part of the crew. They attempted to escape but they were defeated by Mike and Amanda, except Viper, who was taken down by Owen.
 Komodo: A former assistant to Cameron's father, Dr. Theodore Anton wanted revenge for being double-crossed by Vanderhaussen. He wears a large dragon helmet and uses an atomic flamethrower to burn down buildings. He is portrayed by Bryan Friday.
 Dollhouse: Dollhouse captured people and put mind control devices around their necks so they would act like moving dolls. Towards the climax of the episode, Mike finds that Dollhouse never had any friends and had a lonely childhood, which influenced his evil plan. He is defeated when he attempts to shoot Mike with tranquilizer darts but Mike catches one and throws it at Dollhouse's hand. He is portrayed by Tyler Poelle.
 X: A skilled assassin from the mob that was out to kill the person Mike's father was protecting. He was identified by the X-shaped scar on the back of his neck. He was disguised at the train conductor and took control of the train leading to a Sci-Fi Convention. He is portrayed by Christopher Maleki.
 House of Lords: A British crime group whose weapons were cricket paddles and are led by Sir Nigel Wickett. They were after Kickbutt (Lucas Cruikshank) after he stole their money. They are defeated by the ninjas and Kickbutt. Two of them are portrayed by Mark Lindsay Chapman and Ray Park.
 Morningstar Academy: A boarding school where the headmistress, Ms. Morningstar, turns troubled girls into skilled thieves, who has them rob for her, they are wanted in several countries. One is named Clarissa and two more are Fiona (Allison Caetano) and Bethany. They are all defeated by Amanda. They are portrayed by Paulette P. Williams as Ms. Morningstar, Kiralee Hayashi as Bethany, Allison Caetano as Fiona, and Victorious star Daniella Monet as Clarissa.
 DJ Elephant Head: His real name is Leslie, a former student at Benjamin Rush High School, but was apparently expelled. He used his musical rhythms to make people fall asleep so he could steal a rare diamond called the Eye of India and also for revenge on the school. He battles Owen and is knocked out with his sleeping disk playing and his minions accidentally knock each other out. He is portrayed by internet YouTube star Ryan Higa. DJ Elephant Head, the villain's artist name, is a spoof of the progressive house producer Deadmau5.
 Snakeskin: Benjamin Rush's guidance counselor whose actual name is Susie Scott who lived a double life as a villainess who was using devil diamond snake venom to make popular kids' skin shed because she had a horrible childhood of being bullied by popular kids. She planned to use toxic poison in Melanie's party. She was taken out by Amanda. She is portrayed by Amy Lucas.
 Dr. Eternum: A demented psychiatrist who believes he can manipulate human nature using the word "Gemini". The ninjas were escaping from him but Mike was caught. He tries to turn Mike evil but came to a failure and taken out by him. He is portrayed by Todd Stashwick.
 Mechanov: An evil scientist who believes the only way humankind can evolve is through machine, he saved his children, Optic and Buzzsaw. Mechanov saved them from an explosion and turned them into cyborgs. During his last battle with Mike's Grandfather, his lab exploded and was assumed dead however he survived but was left in a coma. When he comes of age and begins to die, his children go to steal purple diamonds that can power an exoskeleton in order to save his life. His kids are defeated by the Fukunagas. Mechanov's exoskeleton with him in it was defeated by Owen, but was then ironically finished off by Martin. He is portrayed by Holocaust survivor Curt Lowens and his kids are portrayed by Dennis Keiffer and Danielle Burgio.
 Limelight: His original name was Lemuel Lightner, a villain who originally went to college and performed drama with three celebrities and is angry that they became famous and he didn't. So he kidnapped them and wanted to kill them so he could become famous. He is however defeated by Owen and his henchmen are taken out by Mike and Amanda. He is portrayed by That '70s Show star Danny Masterson.
 Frostbite: William Block, a villain whose family used to own the Lickety Splits ice cream company. but were robbed and locked in a freezer where they all caught frostbite and Block lost a finger. For vengeance, he kidnapped criminals by freezing them and keeping them prisoner in his old factory instead of handing them over to the police. He tried to freeze Amanda when she found out his secret, but she was able to defeat him when she threw a shuriken at a liquid nitrogen tank and it froze him. He is portrayed by Steve Monroe.
 Shadow Fly: Shadow Fly claims that he is one of the ninjas that stops the villains of Empire City. Owen warns him to tell everyone he isn't a real ninja. Shadow Fly tricks the ninjas into thinking he's kidnapped so he can capture them. The ninjas stick him to a billboard and everyone figures out he's an imposter. He is portrayed by Bobb'e J. Thompson.
 Wesley: He is the science assistant of Dr. Warner Krowsa; he was tired of listening to Dr. Krowsa's insults, waiting for him to invent something worth stealing, so he stole a telekinesis helmet that allows the wearer to move things with his mind, he tries to destroy Quentin, but was stopped by Mike, Owen, and Amanda. and Amanda kicked him because he disrespected her science project. He is portrayed by Kevin M. Horton.
 Kylie Coors: She used to go to cheer camp with Amanda. She stole money from cheer camp though. Amanda found out and told the coaches. Kylie was sent to juvy. She returns later and is named the cheerleader captain of another school. She goes to Benjamin Rush during Spirit week. She plays nice to mess with Amanda and make people not like Amanda and think that she's crazy. She tricks Amanda to coming to the tunnels. She puts blue prints in Amanda's locker so it can look like she tried to blow up the gym when it really was Kylie. She is defeated later by Amanda. She is portrayed by Big Time Rush star Ciara Bravo.
 Trip Taylor: Trip is a credit card counterfeiter and he kidnapped Flint and Amanda. He is defeated by Mike. He is portrayed by Bucket & Skinner's Epic Adventures star Glenn McCuen.
 Wallflower: Her real name is Gina; she had a huge crush on Owen Reynolds, but he doesn't even know she existed as he has a crush on Paloma Peru. She kidnaps him and tries to change her look to get him to be with her. Owen then kicks Paloma's phone to her to call for help. Mike and Amanda show up but they didn't actually defeat her, because she accidentally locked herself in a box. She is portrayed by Jillian Rose Reed and seems to be based on Poison Ivy from the Batman franchise.
 M@yhem: a group of internet kids who have been cyberbullied because of internet videos of them gone wrong. They try and cause riots and get people to cause mayhem. Their boss is the new student Tyler. He is taken out by Owen.
 Chop Shop: He is a mobster that has a crime ring and uses his garage as a cover. Flint Forster steals from him and wants revenge on him. He kidnapped Amanda to get Flint to come back. He is defeated by the ninjas and Flint. He is portrayed by Sam Turich.

Episodes

Season 1 (2011–12)

Season 2 (2013)

Awards and nominations

References

External links 

 

2010s American high school television series
2010s American superhero comedy television series
2010s American teen sitcoms
2010s Nickelodeon original programming
2011 American television series debuts
2013 American television series endings
American action television series
English-language television shows
Ninja fiction
Holography in television
Martial arts television series
Teen superhero television series
Television series about teenagers